Pingjiang may refer to:

Pingjiang County, in Yueyang, Hunan, China
Pingjiang District, in Suzhou, Jiangsu, China